Penicillium claviforme is a species of Penicillium within the phylum Ascomycota.

It is found within the subgenus Terverticillium.
It has a coremium-type morphology in the sexual structures, named for its resemblance to matchsticks.
It is also known as Penicillium vulpinum.

Also known as synnema, meaning 'pillow', because of the closely appressed conidiophores.

References

claviforme